An ottoman is a piece of furniture. Generally ottomans have neither backs nor arms. They may be an upholstered low couch or a smaller cushioned seat used as a table, stool or footstool. The seat may have hinges and form a lid for the inside hollow, which can be used for storage of linen, magazines or other items, making it a form of storage furniture. The smaller version is usually placed near to an armchair or sofa as part of living room decor or may be used as a fireside seat. 

Ottoman footstools are often sold as coordinating furniture with armchairs, sofas or gliders. Other names for this piece of furniture include footstool, tuffet, hassock, pouf (sometimes spelled pouffe), in Shropshire, England the old dialect word tumpty may be used, or in New Zealand and Newfoundland a humpty.

History
The ottoman traces its roots to furnishing practices in the Ottoman Empire, where it was the central piece of residential seating, generally designed as a low wooden platform intended to be piled with cushions. It was first designed as sectional furniture that wrapped around three walls of a room, before evolving into smaller versions that fit into the corner of a room or circular padded seats surrounding a column or pole in a public room.

The ottoman was eventually brought to Europe from the Ottoman Empire in the late 18th century and named after its place of origin. The earliest known instance of the use of the name is ottomane in French in 1729, and in the course of a generation it made its way into every boudoir, but it appears originally to have been much larger than at present.

The first known recorded use in English occurs in one of Thomas Jefferson's memorandum books from 1789: "P[ai]d. for an Ottomane of velours d'Utrecht." Over time, European ottomans took on a circular or octagonal shape through the 19th century, with seating divided in the center by arms or by a central, padded column that might hold a plant or statue. The ottoman began to have hinged seats to make use of the empty space inside which can be used to store items.

The ottoman footstool, a closely allied piece of furniture, was an upholstered footstool on four legs, which could also be used as a fireside seat, the seat covered with carpet, embroidery or beadwork. By the 20th century the word ottoman had come to encompass both forms.

References

External links

 

Furniture
Couches
Chairs
Benches (furniture)
Upholstery